Christmas Memories is a 1915 American silent drama film directed by Robert Z. Leonard and starring Leonard, Ella Hall and Marc B. Robbins.

Plot

Cast
 Robert Z. Leonard as Robert Harding
 Ella Hall as Little Sunshine
 Marc B. Robbins as Reverend Baker 
 Kingsley Benedict as Beppo

References

Bibliography
 Paul C. Spehr & Gunnar Lundquist. American Film Personnel and Company Credits, 1908-1920. McFarland, 1996.

External links
 

1915 films
1915 comedy films
American silent feature films
American black-and-white films
Films directed by Robert Z. Leonard
Universal Pictures films
1910s English-language films
1910s American films
Silent American comedy films